The red-winged francolin (Scleroptila levaillantii) is a species of bird in the family Phasianidae.  It is found in Angola, Burundi, Democratic Republic of the Congo, Kenya, Lesotho, Malawi, Rwanda, South Africa, Eswatini, Tanzania, Uganda, and Zambia.

Elgon francolin (Francolinus elgonensis) may be a hybrid between the red-winged francolin and the moorland francolin.

References

External links
 Red-winged Francolin - Species text in The Atlas of Southern African Birds

red-winged francolin
Birds of Sub-Saharan Africa
red-winged francolin
Taxonomy articles created by Polbot